The languages of Bolivia include Spanish; several dozen indigenous languages, most prominently Aymara, Quechua, Chiquitano, and Guaraní; Bolivian Sign Language (closely related to American Sign Language); and languages of immigrants such as Plautdietsch. Indigenous languages and Spanish are official languages of the state according to the 2009 Constitution. The constitution says that all indigenous languages are official, listing 36 specific languages, of which some are extinct. Spanish and Quechua are spoken primarily in the Andes region, Aymara is mainly spoken in the Altiplano around Lake Titicaca, Chiquitano is spoken in the central part of Santa Cruz, and Guaraní is spoken in the southeast on the border with Paraguay.

List of official languages

The following languages are listed as official languages in the Constitution of Bolivia.

 Castilian (Spanish)
 Aymara
 Araona
 Baure
 Bésiro (Chiquitano)
 Canichana
 Cavineño
 Cayubaba
 Chácobo
 Chimán
 Ese Ejja
 Guaraní
 Guarasu'we
 Guarayu
 Itonama
 Leco
 Machajuyai-Kallawaya
 Machineri
 Maropa
 Mojeño-Ignaciano
 Mojeño-Trinitario
 Moré
 Mosetén
 Movima
 Pacawara
 Puquina
 Quechua
 Sirionó
 Tacana
 Tapieté
 Toromona
 Uru-Chipaya
 Weenhayek
 Yaminawa
 Yuki
 Yuracaré
 Zamuco

In 2019, the Bolivian government and the Plurinational Institute for the Study of Languages and Cultures (Ipelec) announced plans to extend constitutional recognition to three additional indigenous languages.

 Joaquiniano
 Kumsa
 Paunaka

Demographics

Official status 

The Bolivian government and the departmental governments are required to use at least two languages in their operation, one being Spanish, and the other being selected according to the circumstances and the needs of the territory in question. These requirements appear in Article 234 of the 2009 Constitution and the General Law of Linguistic Rights and Policies (Law 269 of August 2, 2012); the law provided a three-year deadline to government functionaries, although there was no immediate punishment for officials who failed to comply. Departmental and municipal autonomous governments are required to use the languages of their territory, always including Spanish.

Following the National Education Reform of 1994, all thirty indigenous languages were introduced alongside Spanish in the country's schools. However, many schools did not implement the reforms, especially urban schools.

Bolivia's national anthem has been translated into six indigenous languages: Aymara, Bésiro-Chiquitano, Guaraní, Guarayu, Quechua, and Mojeño-Trinitario.

Bolivia has 12 million inhabitants. Only 5 languages of Bolivia are spoken by more than 30,000 people: Spanish monolingual (5 million speakers), Kichwa (2.4 million speakers), Aymara (1.5 million), Low German (Plattdeutsch) (100,000 speakers) and Guaraní (33,000 speakers). Of these all are official except Plattdeutsch. There are 8 official languages spoken by between 1,000 and 8,000 people each. So of the 37 languages declared official by the constitution of 2009, 23 are spoken by less than 1,000 people and 2 are extinct (puquina and machajuyai-kallawaya).

Languages without official status 

Standard German is spoken by 160,000 of whom about 70,000 are Mennonites in Santa Cruz Department. These Mennonites speak Plautdietsch, a German dialect, as everyday language but use Standard German for reading and writing and as formal language e.g. in church. Portuguese is also spoken near Bolivia's border with Brazil and around 0.2% of Bolivia speaks it as their mother tongue.

See also 
 Bolivian Spanish

References

External links 
 Lenguas de Bolivia (online edition)